Kim Hye-yong (born 25 August 1981,) is a North Korean women's international footballer who plays as a midfielder. She is a member of the North Korea women's national football team. She was part of the team at the 2006 Asian Games, appearing in two matches during the tournament. On club level she played for April 25 in North Korea.

References

1981 births
Living people
North Korean women's footballers
North Korea women's international footballers
Place of birth missing (living people)
Women's association football midfielders
Footballers at the 2006 Asian Games
Asian Games gold medalists for North Korea
Asian Games medalists in football
Medalists at the 2006 Asian Games
21st-century North Korean women